Prudence Petitpas was a Belgian comics series, created by Maurice Maréchal.

Concept
Prudence Petitpas is a humoristic series about an old lady, Prudence Petitpas, who lives in the fictional village Moucheron. Much like Miss Marple, she investigates crimes that the police can not solve.

Characters
 Prudence Petitpas: A charming old lady.
 Stanislas: Her cat.
 Cyprien: A police officer who often comes to Prudence's aid.
 Inspector Robur Duroc: A police inspector.
 Jojo: A young boy who is a good friend and useful aid to Prudence.

History
In 1957 Prudence Petitpas was published in Tintin, under recommendation of his neighbour Raymond Macherot. The series centered around an old lady who solved crimes. Maréchal purposefully choose for a senior character to stand out among other comics series who usually had younger protagonists. Originally the series was published in shorter stories, later developed into longer adventures. The series was terminated in 1967 so that Maréchal could concentrate better on his daytime job as a Spanish teacher in Verviers. In 1983 he took time to create new stories, published in Spirou instead, where they ran until 1987.

The scripts were written by René Goscinny, Greg, Raymond Macherot and Mittéï. The series was translated into Dutch, Italian, German, Spanish and Arab.

TV animated series
In 2001 Prudence Petitpas was adapted into an animated TV series as Les enquêtes de Prudence Petipas (The Investigations of Prudence Petipas). It was produced by SEK Studio and Carrere Group D.A. and broadcast on TF1. 52 half-hour episodes were made and ran for two seasons in 2001 and 2004.

References

External links

Belgian comic strips
Petitpas, Prudence
Humor comics
Mystery comics
Crime comics
Adventure comics
1957 comics debuts
1967 comics endings
1983 comics debuts
1987 comics endings
Petitpas, Prudence
Petitpas, Prudence
Petitpas, Prudence
Petitpas, Prudence
Petitpas, Prudence
Petitpas, Prudence
Comics adapted into television series
Comics adapted into animated series
Lombard Editions titles
Dupuis titles
Belgian children's animated television series
French children's animated television series
2000s French animated television series
2001 French television series debuts
2001 Belgian television series debuts
2004 French television series endings
2004 Belgian television series endings
Television series based on Belgian comics

pt:A Avó Detective